Herbert Bockhorn (born 31 January 1995) is a Ugandan professional footballer who plays as a right-back for 2. Bundesliga club 1. FC Magdeburg.

Club career

Youth career
Bockhorn started playing football from TSV Melsdorf and FC Kilia Kiel before joining Werder Bremen's youth where he played for the U17 and U19 teams.

Werder Bremen III, II and SC Wiedenbrück 2000
Bockhorn joined Werder Bremen's second reserves from the club's U19 team. He made his senior debut on 27 August 2014 against SG Aumund-Vegesack.
On 21 September 2014 Bockhorn played his first game with the Werder Bremen's reserves against TSV Havelse. Bockhorn joined SC Wiedenbrück 2000 from Werder Bremen II. He made his debut on 1 August 2015 against Rot-Weiss Essen.

Borussia Dortmund II
Bockhorn joined Borussia Dortmund II in 2016. He made his debut on 12 August 2016 against Rot-Weiß Oberhausen. He scored his first goal on 27 August 2017 against Borussia Mönchengladbach II. Bockhorn played for Borussia Dortmund's senior team on two occasions: on 22 July 2018 at Bank of America Stadium. He played against Liverpool during International Champions Cup.

Huddersfield Town
In July 2019, Bockhorn moved to English club Huddersfield Town, reuniting him with manager Jan Siewert, who had coached Bockhorn during his time with Borussia Dortmund's reserves. On 13 August 2019, Bockhorn made his debut for Huddersfield Town, in the first round of the EFL Cup against Lincoln City. However, on 16 August, Siewert was sacked; Bockhorn's services fell out of favour under new manager Danny Cowley, and he departed the club at the end of the season, without making a league appearance.

VfL Bochum
In July 2020 Bockhorn signed a one-year contract with VfL Bochum.

1. FC Magdeburg
In September 2022 Bockhorn joined 2. Bundesliga  club 1. FC Magdeburg as a free agent.

International career
On 9 March 2019, Bockhorn was invited by Uganda head coach Sébastien Desabre to be part of the final team preparing for the final 2019 Africa Cup of Nations qualifying game against Tanzania.

Personal life
Bockhorn was born to a Ugandan mother, Jean Marion Nansubuga, and a German father, Hartwig Bockhorn. Later the family moved to Germany, where Bockhorn started his career as a footballer at TSV Melsdorf.

Career statistics

References

External links
 

1995 births
Living people
Sportspeople from Kampala
Association football defenders
Ugandan footballers
German footballers
Ugandan people of German descent
German people of Ugandan descent
Bundesliga players
Regionalliga players
Borussia Dortmund II players
Huddersfield Town A.F.C. players
SV Werder Bremen II players
VfL Bochum players
1. FC Magdeburg players
Ugandan expatriate footballers
Ugandan expatriate sportspeople in England
Expatriate footballers in England